Androgeos or Androgeus (Ancient Greek: Ἀνδρόγεως,  derived from andros "of a man" and geos, genitive gē "earth, land") was the name of two individuals in Classical mythology.

 Androgeus, son of Minos and Pasiphaë.
 Androgeus, a Greek soldier during the sack of Troy.

Notes

References 

 Apollodorus, The Library with an English Translation by Sir James George Frazer, F.B.A., F.R.S. in 2 Volumes, Cambridge, MA, Harvard University Press; London, William Heinemann Ltd. 1921. ISBN 0-674-99135-4. Online version at the Perseus Digital Library. Greek text available from the same website.
 Publius Vergilius Maro, Aeneid. Theodore C. Williams. trans. Boston. Houghton Mifflin Co. 1910. Online version at the Perseus Digital Library.
 Publius Vergilius Maro, Bucolics, Aeneid, and Georgics. J. B. Greenough. Boston. Ginn & Co. 1900. Latin text available at the Perseus Digital Library.

 Smith, William; Dictionary of Greek and Roman Biography and Mythology, London (1873). "Androgeus"

Characters in Greek mythology